Samuel Schmucker may refer to:
Samuel D. Schmucker (1844–1911), American jurist
Samuel Mosheim Schmucker (1823–1863), American historical writer
Samuel Simon Schmucker (1799–1873), German-American Lutheran pastor and theologian